Farm Tour is a concert series put on by Luke Bryan at the beginning of October every year. Bryan came up with the concept as a way of giving back to the local farming communities, with the proceeds from the concerts going to charities and creating scholarships for students from farming families to attend local community colleges.

Preceding the 2016 Farm Tour, the extended play Farm Tour... Here's to the Farmer was released by Bryan.

Tour dates

References

External links
 Tour Farm 2014

2011 concert tours
2012 concert tours
2013 concert tours
2014 concert tours
2015 concert tours
2016 concert tours
2017 concert tours
2018 concert tours
2019 concert tours
Luke Bryan concert tours